Victor Valley is the southern portion of the phase 1 Brightline West rail line running to Las Vegas Boulevard in the Las Vegas Valley and future extensions continuing south to Palmdale, Rancho Cucamonga, and Los Angeles.

The station will be at the north end of the town of Apple Valley near Interstate 15 and Dale Evans Parkway. Construction permits were acquired in March 2020 by Brightline, construction was expected to begin in the second half of 2021, and the station is expected to open in the second half of 2024. The area will include a maintenance facility for all Brightline west equipment, with a train staging facility, as well as the Brightline West station. Victor Valley is the planned terminus of the initial phase 1 route with planned extensions to Rancho Cucamonga and a proposed extension to Los Angeles Union Station. The site also sits near existing freight rail tracks with existing Amtrak Southwest Chief services to Chicago and Los Angeles and future connections are possible with the location of both sites.

History 

The link would initially connect to the Metrolink system in Palmdale. This would allow passengers to complete a train ride between Los Angeles and Las Vegas with one transfer by using Metrolink in the Los Angeles area and a transfer to the high-speed train at Palmdale station with Victor Valley serving as a through station for the line. The original plan was that the train would travel at speeds of up to  averaging  and making the  trip from Victor Valley to Las Vegas Valley in about 1 hour 24 minutes. That was subject to funding that never was allocated for the project. In 2018, Brightline West bought the projects plans and made a newer plan with  trains making the journey from Victor Valley much faster and slightly changing the station design.

References

External links
Brightline West, Town of Apple Valley: Economic Development

Brightline stations
Railway stations in San Bernardino County, California
Proposed railway stations in the United States